William Francis de Vismes Kane (1840 – 1918) was an Irish entomologist

Born in Exmouth, Devon Kane lived at Drumreaske House in Monaghan. His mother was French. He was appointed Sheriff of Monaghan for 1865.

Most of Kanes collecting was in Monaghan and at Favour Royal in County Tyrone but his collection contains insects from the entirety of Ireland. He also collected extensively in Europe as well as maintaining an extensive collection of world butterflies. After 1901, Kane, a leisured country gentleman,  suddenly gave up entomology and left Ireland, leaving his collection to the National Museum of Ireland.

Works 
A catalogue of the Lepidoptera of Ireland. London.West Newman & Co.. 166pp. Fine coloured frontis of 15 varieties of Irish Lepidoptera. (1901) _ the third (and first comprehensive) catalogue of the Irish macrolepidoptera.
European Butterflies Macmillan. 184pp. Some b/w photos(1885).

Arms

References

Sources
Anonym 1918: [Kane, W. F. V.] - Ent. Rec. J. Var. 30 157   
Anonym 1919: [Kane, W. F. V.] - Ent. News 30 209   
Edwards, S. 1918–1919: [Kane, W. F. de Vismes] - Proc. Soc. London Ent. & N. H. Soc. : 36   
Gardner, W. 1918: [Kane, W. F. V.] - Entomologist's Monthly Magazine (3) 54 254-255   
H. R. B. 1918: [Kane, W. F. V.] - Ent. 51 240

1840 births
1918 deaths
People from Exmouth
High Sheriffs of Monaghan
Irish entomologists